was a bureaucrat and cabinet minister in early Shōwa period Japan.

Biography
Ohara was born in what is now Nagaoka, Niigata as the third son of Tanaka Keijiro, a former samurai, the son of an impoverished former samurai, but was later adopted by Ohara Tomotada, a former samurai from Aizu Domain, and took the Ohara surname. One of his early classmates was the future diplomat Matsudaira Tsuneo. He graduated from the law school of Tokyo Imperial University in July 1902 and received a posting to the Ministry of Justice (Japan) as a public prosecutor. He served in that capacity for the next few years with the Shizuoka District Court, the Tokyo District Court and the Chiba District Court, and made a name in several trials involving high-profile corruption scandals, notably the Ōura scandal and Siemens scandal, as well as in the High Treason Incident, where he was the lead interrogator for prosecuting Kanno Sugako.

Ohara was appointed as Deputy Minister of Justice under Yoshimichi Hara in the Tanaka administration, serving in the same post under the subsequent Hamaguchi, Inukai and Saito administrations. Under the Okada administration, he joined the cabinet as Minister of Justice from 1934 to 1936. One of his first actions was to poll several bar associations on the need for judicial reform, including the simplification and streamlining of legal procedures. 
During his tenure, he presided over a number of crisis, including the Teijin Incident, and February 26 Incident. On being informed of the failure of the rebels to assassinate Prime Minister Okada by the prime minister's chief secretary Hisatsune Sakomizu, he quickly urged Okada to visit the Imperial Palace for safety and to secure the support of Emperor Hirohito against the rebellion. These actions earned him the wrath of the Imperial Japanese Army General Staff Office, which refused to sanction his continuation as Justice Minister under the Hirota administration. He strenuously opposed the actions of his successor, Suehiko Shiono in 1937 and 1938 and was not given a post in the first Konoe administration or the Hiranuma administration, but returned to the cabinet in August 1939 under the Abe administration as both Minister of Welfare and Home Minister.  However, his disagreements over the enforcement of Japan's increasingly totalitarian application of the Peace Preservation Laws against “thought crimes”, speaking out against police abuse of power and bureaucratic incivility to the general populace  alienated him from the supporters of his rival Shiono, and he resigned in January 1940.

Ohara returned to the government of Post-occupation Japan under the 5th Yoshida administration in June 1954 as Minister of Justice as well as Chairman of the National Public Safety Commission. He retired in December 1954.

References
 Hall, John Whitney.  The Cambridge History of Modern Japan. Cambridge University Press (1988). 
 Rohl, Wilheim. History Of Law In Japan Since 1868. Brill (2005). 
 Mitchell, Robert H.  Justice in Japan: The Notorious Teijin Scandal. University of Hawaii Press (2002). 
 Mitchell, Robert H.  Janus-Faced Justice: Political Criminals in Imperial Japan. University of Hawaii Press (1992). 
Press (2002). 
 Mitchell, Robert H.  Janus-Faced Justice: Political Criminals in Imperial Japan . University of Hawaii Press (1996).

Notes

 

1877 births
1967 deaths
Members of the House of Peers (Japan)
People from Nagaoka, Niigata
University of Tokyo alumni
Government ministers of Japan
Ministers of Home Affairs of Japan
Ministers of Justice of Japan